Rochester is a town in Windsor County, Vermont, United States. The population was 1,099 at the 2020 census. The central village is delineated as the Rochester census-designated place.

Set on the edge of the Green Mountain National Forest, the town is a picturesque tourist destination.

History

Rochester was granted in 1780, chartered in 1781 to Dudley Chase, Asa Whitcomb and 63 others, then organized in 1788. It was first settled in the winter of 1781–1782 by David Currier and his family. Rochester's boundaries expanded through annexation of part of Pittsfield town in 1806, annexation of an additional area from Pittsfield town plus a part of Braintree town in 1824, a part of Hancock town in 1834, and finally an annexation of part of Goshen town in 1847.

The surface of the town is mountainous and broken, but the intervales along the White River provided good farmland. There were sites supplying water power for mills. By 1859, when the population was 1,493, industries included one gristmill, several sawmills, one tub factory, and a variety of mechanic shops. The White River Railroad from Bethel opened to Rochester in 1900, but was abandoned in 1933 during the Great Depression.

Rochester was one of thirteen Vermont towns isolated by flooding caused by Hurricane Irene in 2011.

In 2018, Rochester High School and Middle School closed due to Act 46. The school had been in Rochester since 1886 and the current building had been used since 1974.

Geography
Rochester is drained by the White River.

The town is crossed by Vermont Route 73 and Vermont Route 100.

Demographics

As of the census of 2000, there were 1,171 people, 511 households, and 330 families residing in the town.  The population density was 20.8 people per square mile (8.0/km2).  There were 768 housing units at an average density of 13.7 per square mile (5.3/km2).  The racial makeup of the town was 98.46% White, 0.17% African American, 0.17% Asian, and 1.20% from two or more races. Hispanic or Latino of any race were 1.20% of the population.

There were 511 households, out of which 28.2% had children under the age of 18 living with them, 52.4% were couples living together and joined in either marriage or civil union, 8.8% had a female householder with no husband present, and 35.4% were non-families. 28.6% of all households were made up of individuals, and 11.2% had someone living alone who was 65 years of age or older. The average household size was 2.26 and the average family size was 2.76.

In the town, the population was spread out, with 22.1% under the age of 18, 5.0% from 18 to 24, 26.3% from 25 to 44, 28.8% from 45 to 64, and 17.8% who were 65 years of age or older.  The median age was 43 years. For every 100 females, there were 93.2 males.  For every 100 females age 18 and over, there were 96.6 males.

The median income for a household in the town was $35,820, and the median income for a family was $41,131. Males had a median income of $30,395 versus $21,964 for females. The per capita income for the town was $19,986.  About 4.2% of families and 6.0% of the population were below the poverty line, including 8.5% of those under age 18 and 1.0% of those age 65 or over.

Site of interest
 Green Mountain National Forest

Notable people 

Barbara Fiske Calhoun, World War II cartoonist, artist and co-founder of Quarry Hill Creative Center
 William Wildman Campbell, US congressman from Ohio
 Irving Fiske, playwright and co-founder of Quarry Hill Creative Center in Rochester
 Robert H. Gardner, Academy Award nominated filmmaker, resides in Rochester
 Jeremiah Ingalls, early American composer
 William B. Martin, Iowa Secretary of State
 Edna Chaffee Noble, elocutionist
 James Whitcomb, US senator and the eighth governor of Indiana

Climate
This climatic region is typified by large seasonal temperature differences, with warm to hot (and often humid) summers and cold (sometimes severely cold) winters.  According to the Köppen Climate Classification system, Rochester has a humid continental climate, abbreviated "Dfb" on climate maps.

References

External links

 Town of Rochester official website
 Rochester Public Library
 Rochester Historical Society
 Rochester School District
 Rochester at Virtual Vermont
 Historic Pierce Hall

 
Towns in Vermont
Towns in Windsor County, Vermont
Populated places established in 1780